Naryandos or Nariandos was a town of ancient Caria. It was a polis (city-state).
 
Its site is unlocated, but suggested to be near Halicarnassus.

References

Populated places in ancient Caria
Former populated places in Turkey
Greek city-states
Lost ancient cities and towns